Nikolskoye is a rural locality (a village) in Sterlibashevsky Selsoviet, Sterlibashevsky District, Bashkortostan, Russia. The population was 70 as of 2010. There are 3 streets.

Geography 
Nikolskoye is located 7 km north of Sterlibashevo (the district's administrative centre) by road. Pervomaysky is the nearest rural locality.

References 

Rural localities in Sterlibashevsky District